Carole A. Fiola is an American politician elected to the Massachusetts House of Representatives in September 2013. She was sworn-in September 25, 2013. She is a Fall River resident and a member of the Democratic Party.

Fiola served five two-year terms on the Massachusetts Governor's Council, to which she was first elected in 2000. She decided against seeking re-election in 2010. She is also a real estate agent in Fall River.

See also
 2019–2020 Massachusetts legislature
 2021–2022 Massachusetts legislature

References

External links 
 Campaign web site
 State web site

Living people
Democratic Party members of the Massachusetts House of Representatives
Politicians from Fall River, Massachusetts
21st-century American politicians
1960 births